Vincent Beduer (born 17 March 1987 in Figeac) is a French professional football player. Currently, he plays in the Championnat National for Aviron Bayonnais FC.

He played on the professional level in Ligue 2 for Montpellier HSC.

1987 births
Living people
French footballers
Ligue 2 players
Montpellier HSC players
AS Moulins players
Association football defenders